The 1956 Kategoria e Dytë was the 11th season of a second-tier association football league in Albania. The season had started in March and ended in August. Even the Second Division begins to take on a fixed formula, moving in 1956 to the seven single-group teams. Spartaku Tiranë wins league and promotion title by outperforming opponents, while Spartaku Pogradec was the first team to officially relegated to the regional divisions, from which Puna Peshkopi was advanced. This season was followed by the 1957 season.

League table

Notes

References

Kategoria e Parë seasons
Albania
2